The Basílica of the Black Virgin of Monserrat (Spanish: El Santuario de la Monserrate de Hormigueros and Casa de los Peregrinos) is a historical Roman Catholic shrine built in the town of Hormigueros, Puerto Rico as dedicated to the Blessed Virgin Mary as a Black Madonna under the Marian title of “Virgin of Montserrat”.

Pope John Paul II granted a pontifical decree of canonical coronation titled Omnibus Manifestum towards its venerated Marian image on 18 July 1994. The Archbishop of San Juan, Cardinal Luis Aponte Martínez executed the rite of coronation on 12 February 1995. The same Pontiff issued a decree titled Celeberrimum in Civitate that raised the sanctuary to the status of a minor basilica on 19 May 1998.

History

The foundation of the basilica is on the site of a rural chapel built by the Catalan estate owner Don Gerardo González, who was the owner of the valleys of the region. Although the specific date when the original chapel was constructed is not known, some records date it as far as 1590. Also, radiocarbon dating tests done to pieces of wood from a coffin found in the basilica point to the existence of the chapel as far back as 1570.

The structure combines romantic elements and styles in its architecture, including a bell tower with Mozarabic elements.

In 1696, the chapel acquired a guest house called Casa de Peligrinos (Pilgrims House). In 1814, Juan Alejo de Arizmendi, the first native Puerto Rican bishop, fell ill in this house after traveling around the island in his second pastoral visit. He desired to be buried in his beloved chapel. He died in Arecibo the following October 12, but his wishes were not followed, burial instead taking place in his cathedral. The house is now the rectory of the basilica.

The basilica and its rectory were listed on the National Register of Historic Places in 1975 as the Santuario de la Monserate de Hormigueros and Casa de Peregrinos.

In 19 May 1998, Pope John Paul II issued a pontifical decree that raised the status of the structure to a minor basilica, a distinction held previously on the island only by the Cathedral of San Juan Bautista in the capital.

On 24 October 1999, the Archbishop of San Juan, Roberto González Nieves, Roberto González Nieves read the papal decree before the public in commemoration of the shrines 400th centennial anniversary.

Folklore

There is folklore about the town's founder, an explanation of why the church in the town, Basílica Menor de la Virgen de Monserrate, became so important. The legend has to do with the townspeople aiding Geraldo in finding his eight-year-old daughter, "with eyes as blue as the turquoise skies", when she disappeared. When his daughter was found 15 days later she was unharmed, not hungry, and unafraid and happily explained that a beautiful, black woman had helped her, caressed her face and given her fruit. Geraldo reported it was the Virgin of Montserrat and Geraldo said that for having helped his daughter she would be venerated for all ages. Many people heard of the tale but it had not been the first tale from Geraldo. The first and more popular tale from Geraldo had been that a savage bull was going to attack him and when he prayed, the bull bent its knees, bowed its head to the ground, and didn't attack. Some versions of the story state the bull's legs actually broke rendering the bull immobile and unable to charge at him. Since then, many Catholics perform penitence by walking the steps to the church on their knees. Many pilgrimages have been made to the church, even as early as in the 17th century.

See also

Roman Catholic Diocese of Mayagüez
National Register of Historic Places in Hormigueros, Puerto Rico
Latin American miracles
List of the oldest buildings in Puerto Rico
Votive offering

References

External links

Hormigueros, Puerto Rico
Basilica churches in Puerto Rico
Tourist attractions in Puerto Rico
Churches on the National Register of Historic Places in Puerto Rico
Puerto Rican legends
Supernatural legends
16th-century establishments in Puerto Rico
16th-century Roman Catholic church buildings